Pseudoechthistatus is a genus of longhorn beetles of the subfamily Lamiinae, containing the following species:

 Pseudoechthistatus acutipennis Chiang, 1981
 Pseudoechthistatus birmanicus Breuning, 1942
 Pseudoechthistatus chiangshunani Bi & Lin, 2016
 Pseudoechthistatus glabripennis Bi & Lin, 2016
 Pseudoechthistatus granulatus Breuning, 1942
 Pseudoechthistatus holzschuhi Bi & Lin, 2016
 Pseudoechthistatus obliquefasciatus Pic, 1917
 Pseudoechthistatus pufujiae Bi & Lin, 2016
 Pseudoechthistatus sinicus Bi & Lin, 2016

References

Phrissomini